Fugitives is a 1929 American pre-Code drama film directed by William Beaudine and starring Madge Bellamy, Don Terry and Arthur Stone. Future stars Jean Harlow and Virginia Bruce both had small parts in the film.

Cast
 Madge Bellamy as Alice Carroll 
 Don Terry as Dick Starr 
 Arthur Stone as Jimmy 
 Earle Foxe as Al Barrow 
 Matthew Betz as Earl Rand 
 Lumsden Hare as Uncle Ned 
 Edith Yorke as Mrs. Carroll

References

Bibliography
 Marshall, Wendy L. William Beaudine: From Silents to Television. Scarecrow Press, 2005.

External links

1929 films
American drama films
American black-and-white films
1929 drama films
1920s English-language films
Films directed by William Beaudine
Fox Film films
Films based on American novels
1920s American films